Nandurbar  is a city and a municipal council in Nandurbar district in the Indian state of Maharashtra. Nandurbar municipal corporation is the first municipal corporation. The District Nandurbar was formed from the district Dhule on July 1, 1998. Nandurbar is an administrative district in the northwest corner of (Khandesh region) of Maharashtra. On 1 July 1998 Dhule was bifurcated as two separate districts now known as Dhule and Nandurbar. The district headquarters is located at Nandurbar city. The district occupies an area of 5034 km2 and has a population of 1,311,709 of which 15.45% is urban (as of 2001). Nandurbar district is bounded to the south and south-east by Dhule district, to the west and north is the state of Gujarat, to the north and north-east is the state of Madhya Pradesh. The northern boundary of the district is defined by the great Narmada river.  It came into limelight during February 2006 bird flu crisis which struck many of its poultry farms. Thousand of chickens from the farms had to be killed and buried in nearby grounds to stop the virus spreading.

History
The district was part of the Khandesh district with Dhule and Jalgaon till July 1998. According to some, khandesh means the country of Lord Krishna. The ancient name of this region is Rasika, when Nandurbar was also called Nandanagri after the name of its king Nandaraja.

The district is also rich with mythological accounts of the Ramayana, where the region is referred to as ‘Krushik’.

The region is linked to various rulers of the time including Chalukyas, Vartakas and Yadavas.

Prior to Mughal era, Khandesh formed the southern boundary of the Tughlaq Empire.

Due to its strategic location at the ends of Gujarat and Madhya Pradesh, Nandurbar kept shifting into different power regimes. After the Mughal Empire's decline, the Marathas took control of Khandesh and subsequently on 3 June 1818 the Maratha Peshwa surrendered Khandesh to the British rule.

Nandurbar had its own share in the Indian struggle for independence. It was here that during the Quit India Movement of 1942 Shirish Kumar, a mere boy of 15 years, lost his life by a gun shot. A small memorial has been erected in memory of Shirish Kumar in the square where he shed his blood.

Geography
It has an average elevation of 210 metres (688 feet). It has mainly a hilly region and has 'Toranmal' hill station which is 75 km from the Nandurbar district. It is the 2nd hill station after Matheran in Maharashtra.
Tapi river is located at 12 km from city. Narmada river forms the district's boundary on the northern and north-eastern side.it is well known tribal area. hence called tribal district.

Transport 

Nandurbar is served by a station on the Indian Railways network. Also State transport buses are available. Nandurbar is connected to Madhya Pradesh and Gujarat by Indian state highways.

Demographics
 India census, Nandurbar had a population of 1,11,037. Nandurbar has an average literacy rate of 72%, higher than the national average of 59.5%: male literacy is 78%, and female literacy is 65%. In Nandurbar, 12% of the population is under 6 years of age.

Tourist attractions
 Toranmal is nearby hill station.
 Unapdev is (56.7 km) from Nandurbar) is a picnic point in Nandurbar.
 Dantlochan shiv mandir, Brahmanpuri is approx 50km near MP boarder.

View Points
 Yashawant Lake
 Aawashabari Point
 Sunset Point
 Coffee Garden
 Check Dam
 Khadki point
 Tornadevi temple
 Macchindranath cave
 Gorakshanath Temple
 Nagarjun temple
 Nagarjun Point
 Sat Payari View Point
 Lotus Lake
 Forest Park & Medicinal Plant Garden
 Sita Khai
 Dantlochan shiv mandir, Brahmanpuri 
 susri dam, Chandsailli 
 pach pandav cave, lonkheda
 Akrani Mahal Fort
 Asthamba 
Bardharya Waterfall
 Umti waterfall
 Alaldari waterfall
 Dahel waterfall 
Saribar waterfall 
 Kedareshwar temple
Tirthkar Jain leni caves 
 Sarangkheda is famous for its festival and large horse market and Datt temple
 Kochra Mata Mandir, near Shahada
 Unapdev 
 Statue of motivational power[Lonkheda] 
 The famous religious temple is khodai mata mandir (part of pawagadh, Gujarat mataji)
 Wagheshwari mata mandir
 Sankashta mata temple
 Balaji Mandir, in Nandurbar
 Motha Maruti Ram Mandir
 Dandapaneshwar Park
 Ganpati mandir
 Shani temple [Shanimandal]
 Kathoba devasthan
 Walheri waterfall 
 Hutatma Garden 
 Manik Chowk
 Virchak Dam
 Bargal gadhi [Taloda]
 Heramb ganesh temple [Jaynagar]
Abul Gazi chisti R.A Dargah 
C.B. Water Park and Garden
 Bhatesing bhaiya park
 Sayyed Imam Badshash chisti R. A  Dargah Nandurbar
 Chatrapati Shivaji Maharaj natya mandir

See also
Nandurbar Railway Station
Nandurbar Loksabha Constituency
Nandurbar Vidhan Sabha Constituency
Chhatrapati shivaji maharaj natya mandir

References

External links 
 2001 Census District Profile
 Aadiwasi Janjagruti

 
Cities and towns in Nandurbar district
Talukas in Maharashtra
1998 establishments in Maharashtra
Cities in Maharashtra